Weightlifting at the 1980 Summer Paralympics consisted of eleven events for men.

Participating nations 
There were 58 male competitors representing 18 nations.

Medal summary

Medal table 
There were 18 medal winners representing nine nations.

Men's events

References 

 

1980 Summer Paralympics events
1980
Paralympics